Harutaeographa brumosa is a moth of the family Noctuidae. It is found in Nepal (the Terhathum district).

References

Moths described in 1994
Orthosiini